Stéphanie Frappart (born 14 December 1983) is a French football referee. She has been on the FIFA International Referees List since 2009, and has refereed several high-profile matches. She became the first woman to referee a major men's European match and a French Ligue 1 match, both in 2019, and the first woman to officiate a UEFA Champions League match in 2020. In 2021, Frappart became the first woman to take charge of a men's World Cup qualifying match. In 2022, she was one of the three women referees selected to officiate at the men's World Cup, before she became the first woman to referee a men's World Cup match in an all-female referee team.

Career 
Frappart grew up in Herblay-sur-Seine and began refereeing youth games at the age of 13. By the time she was 18, she was already refereeing national u19 games. In 2011, Frappart began to referee matches in the Championnat National, the third division of men's football in France. In 2014, Frappart became the first woman to referee in Ligue 2, the second tier of professional men's football in France.  She served as a referee at the 2015 FIFA Women's World Cup in Canada.

On 3 December 2018, Frappart was appointed to officiate in the 2019 FIFA Women's World Cup in France. After the conclusion of the round of 16, it was announced that Frappart had been selected as one of 11 officials that would be retained for the remainder of the tournament. Frappart would go on to be appointed to referee the final of the tournament which was contested on 7 July 2019 between the United States and the Netherlands.

In April 2019, it was announced that she would become the first female referee in Ligue 1, with her first game coming on 28 April 2019, when she officiated a game between SC Amiens and RC Strasbourg. On 2 August 2019, Frappart was appointed to referee the 2019 UEFA Super Cup between Liverpool and Chelsea. In doing so she became the first woman to officiate in a major men's European match. On 11 November 2019, Frappart officiated the second leg of the inaugural Champions Cup competition, between the league winners of the League of Ireland Premier Division and the NIFL Premiership. The match saw the Republic of Ireland's champions Dundalk beat Northern Ireland's champions Linfield 6–0, with Frappart showing two yellow cards.

On 2 December 2020, she became the first woman to referee a UEFA Champions League match, between Juventus and Dynamo Kyiv. In March 2021, Frappart officiated the second leg of the UEFA Women's Champions League match between Atlético Madrid and Chelsea. Later that month, she became the first woman to officiate a FIFA World Cup qualifier, in a match between the Netherlands and Latvia.

On 7 May 2022, she was the referee for the 2022 Coupe de France Final between Nice and Nantes.

On 19 May 2022, she was selected for the officiating pool at the 2022 FIFA World Cup. On 1 December 2022, she became the first woman to referee a men's FIFA World Cup match when she officiated the match between Costa Rica and Germany.

Awards
 IFFHS World's Best Woman Referee: 2019, 2020, 2021

References

External links

 Profile at WorldFootball.net

 Stéphanie Frappart

Living people
1983 births
Sportspeople from Val-d'Oise
People from Le Plessis-Bouchard
French football referees
FIFA Women's World Cup referees
2022 FIFA World Cup referees
FIFA World Cup referees
Women association football referees
French women referees and umpires
FIFA Women's World Cup Final match officials
UEFA Women's Euro 2022 referees